Comun Nuovo is a comune (municipality) in the Province of Bergamo in the Italian region of Lombardy, located about  northeast of Milan and about  south of Bergamo.

Comun Nuovo borders the following municipalities: Levate, Spirano, Stezzano, Urgnano, Verdello, Zanica.

The city is also known for the many companies that have located their offices in the small town. Heineken, Olmo and Fonderie Pietro Pilenga are among the   companies that have headquarters in Comun Nuovo

References